Lobophora is a genus of moths in the family Geometridae erected by John Curtis in 1825.

Species
Lobophora canavestita (Pearsall, 1906)
Lobophora halterata (Hufnagel, 1767) – seraphim
Lobophora magnoliatoidata (Dyar, 1904)
Lobophora montanata Packard, 1874
Lobophora nivigerata Walker, 1862
Lobophora simsata Swett, 1920

References

Trichopterygini
Moth genera